The Great Famine of 1695–1697, or simply the Great Famine, was a catastrophic famine that affected the present Estonia, Finland, Latvia, Norway and Sweden, all of which belonged to the Swedish Empire with the exception of Norway. The areas worst affected were the Swedish province of Finland and Norrland in Sweden proper.

The Great Famine of 1695–1697 was concurrent with the "seven ill years", a period of national famine in Scotland in the 1690s.

Estonia

Finland
In the Swedish province of Finland, the Great Famine of 1695–97 was also referred to as "The Years of Many Deaths" by some Finnish historians, because it killed about a third of the Finnish population in only two years, or about 150,000 out of 500,000. People widely relied on eating bark bread. It was Finland's worst demographic catastrophe.

The summer of 1695 was particularly cold, and grains grew abnormally slowly. Rye was reported to grow as late as August 6, and early frost destroyed the little that had grown. January and February 1696 were exceptionally warm, and the harvest was started as early as mid-February, but the frost that came in March destroyed the harvest again. The abundant snow caused massive floods in the Spring, which delayed the harvest again.

People resorted to begging on the streets for food, and even cannibalism was reported at least once.

Sweden
From 1688 onward, Sweden had been affected by early frost and bad harvests. This culminated in the winter of 1695, which was described as the coldest since 1658 and the rye did not flower before July. Because of this, the Great Famine of 1695 is also referred to as Det stora svartåret ("The Great Black Year"). The harvest of 1696, furthermore, was reportedly so bad that each farm produced only one loaf of rye bread.
  
Outside of Finland, the northernmost provinces of Sweden were the most severely affected. Desperate famine victims from the countryside left for the cities in search for food, especially to the capital of Stockholm, where in the spring of 1697 the streets were reportedly strewn with corpses and people dying of starvation.

Israel Kolmodin wrote the psalm Den blomstertid nu kommer in 1695 in connection to the famine, intended as a prayer to God that the next summer would bring food.

Causes 
The 1690s marked the lowest point of the Little Ice Age, of colder and wetter weather. This reduced the altitude at which crops could be grown and shortened the growing season by up to two months in extreme years, as it did in the 1690s. The massive eruptions of volcanoes at Hekla in Iceland (1693) and Serua (1693) and Aboina (1694) in Indonesia may also have polluted the atmosphere and filtered out significant amounts of sunlight.

See also
Little Ice Age
Great Northern War plague outbreak
Finnish famine of 1866–1868
Swedish famine of 1867–1869

References

Finland 1695
17th century in Sweden
Famines in Russia
Disasters in Finland
17th-century health disasters
1690s in Finland
1695 in Finland
1696 in Finland
1697 in Finland
1695 in Sweden
1696 in Sweden
1697 in Sweden
1690s in Norway
1695 in Norway
1696 in Norway
1697 in Norway
17th-century famines
Natural disasters in Finland
Incidents of cannibalism
Cannibalism in Europe